David Mark Rothbard (November 6, 1964 – March 30, 2018) was President of the Committee For A Constructive Tomorrow (CFACT), a US non-profit organization he founded with Craig Rucker in 1985 "to promote a positive voice on environment and development issues."

Rothbard, also, co-hosted with CFACT Executive Director, Craig Rucker, a daily national radio commentary called "Just the Facts" that has been airing since 1993 on some 200 radio stations across the US.

Rothbard received his Bachelor of Arts degree from Fairfield University.

Rothbard died on March 30, 2018 after a long illness.

References

External links
 Collegians for a Constructive Tomorrow, the website of CFACT's collegiate affiliates.
 Committee for A Constructive Tomorrow
 

People from Bridgeport, Connecticut
2018 deaths
1964 births
Fairfield University alumni